St Mary's battalion was a Christian militia group known for  fighting against pro-Russian separatists in eastern Ukraine. This organization claimed that they were influenced by Taliban. Chornly, a leader of the battalion told Al Jazeera, "We are creating the Christian Taliban here. Our main ideology is faith, and this is the advantage we have. Our soldiers are the bringers of European traditions and the Christian mindset of the 13th century."

In 2016, the battalion ceased to exist.

History
 

From the beginning, the supporters of Brotherhood, a far right Ukrainian Nationalist political party, founded the "Company of Jesus Christ" as part of the battalion "Azov". Then the company moved to the "Shakhtarsk" battalion. After his disbandment, the company was enlarged into a battalion called St. Mary's and joined the structure of the Ministry of Internal Affairs, and later the National Police, where it was formally assigned to the special operations department.

As a part of the company which is a part of the Mariupol military garrison in sector "M" of anti-terrorist operation, special forces of "St. Mary" took part in defense of Mariupol during the Russian-Ukrainian war of 2014. They adjusted the fire of the Ukrainian artillery and performed reconnaissance and sabotage functions.

In the winter of 2014, St. Mary continued to defend the strategically important city of Mariupol. "This war is forcing us to rapidly learn military wisdom in combat. Yes, now fighters are actively learning skiing. At this time of year, this is almost the only convenient and most effective mean of moving in positions, especially for reconnaissance groups in the field. Since the beginning of the war, not only our volunteers, but also professional soldiers have been discovering everything for the first time. We are becoming real hunters - we need to feel the enemy, understand his tracks and plans" says Commander Seredyuk.

The St. Mary's Battalion, founded by Dmytro Korchynsky, ceased to exist. The decision to dissolve was made by Korchynsky himself. According to Korchynsky, the decision to disband was made due to the impossibility of further staffing the battalion exclusively with its own personnel and due to the fact that "most of its fighters sought to fight, not to protect public order".

Command
The first commander of the battalion of the special police patrol service "St. Mary" - Dmytro Linko. He was elected People's Deputy of Ukraine on the lists of the Radical Party of Oleg Lyashko. Linko resigned as commander, but remained in the battalion as a private. Alexey Seredyuk, nickname "Borghese" became the new commander.

Ternopil police officer Ivan Soldak, nickname "Brest", acted as an assistant commander for relations with state, public and volunteer organizations.

Voluntary assistance
Not Indifferent residents of the city of Irpin, Kyiv region, raised funds and bought an armored Volkswagen minibus, 255 boxes of glucose and 5 boxes of anti-burn drugs for the St. Mary's Battalion. SBU reserve major general Viktor Mikulin and SBU reserve lieutenant colonel Yuriy Lavreniuk delivered a car with a valuable cargo to Mariupol on October 11.

Odesa Vice Mayor Oles Yanchuk brought three tons of food (cereals, pasta, canned food, sugar, tea, etc.), 120 pairs of American military shoes, 100 blankets, clothes for military medical personnel, Kevlar helmets and donated a KrAZ military vehicle to the battalion.

Lviv volunteers from Lviv Polytechnic National University and Lviv People's Self-Defense Fund purchased an Opel Frontera car for the St. Mary's Battalion.

Losses
Kirill Heinz with nickname "German", a volunteer, died on February 10, 2015.
 Valery Deresh with nickname "Amen", a police officer, died on February 22, 2015.
 Vasyl Rosokha with nickname "quiet (tykhy )", a private of the police, died on February 22, 2015.

References

Special tasks patrol police of Ukraine
Paramilitary organizations based in Ukraine